The R331 road is a regional road in southeast County Mayo, Ireland. The route connects the towns of Claremorris and Ballinrobe, and links the N60 road with the N84 road. 

The official description of the R331 from the Roads Act 1993 (Classification of Regional Roads) Order 2006 (Statutory Instrument 188 of 2006) reads:

R331: Claremorris - Ballinrobe, County Mayo

Between its junction with N60 at Inner Relief Road in the town of Claremorris and its junction with N84 at Bridge Street Ballinrobe via Ballyhaunis Road, Main Street and James Street in the town of Claremorris; Rooskeybeg, Tagheen, Hollymount, Cappacurry; and Abbey Street at Ballinrobe all in the county of Mayo.

See also
List of roads of County Mayo
National primary road
National secondary road
Regional road
Roads in Ireland

References

Regional roads in the Republic of Ireland
Roads in County Mayo